Ron Unsworth (8 November 1923 – 23 December 2008) was a British hurdler. He competed in the men's 400 metres hurdles at the 1948 Summer Olympics.

References

External links

1923 births
2008 deaths
Athletes (track and field) at the 1948 Summer Olympics
British male hurdlers
Olympic athletes of Great Britain